Z22 may refer to:
 Z22 (computer),  the seventh computer model developed by Konrad Zuse
 Z22 (handheld), a Palm, Inc.'s handheld model
 German destroyer Z22 Anton Schmitt, a Type 1936 destroyer built for the Kriegsmarine in the late 1930s